Cyril Herbert George Bland (23 May 1872 – 1 July 1950) was an English cricketer active from 1897 to 1904 who played for Sussex. He was born in Boston, Lincolnshire, where he was educated at Boston Grammar School, and died at Cowbridge, Boston, Lincolnshire, Lincolnshire. He appeared in 147 first-class matches as a righthanded batsman who bowled right arm fast. He scored 998 runs with a highest score of 59 and took 557 wickets with a best performance of ten for 48.

Bland achieved his ten wickets in an innings feat playing for Sussex against Kent at the Angel Ground, Tonbridge, in the 1900 season.

Aged 78, Bland committed suicide by drowning himself in the Greenlands Drain in Boston, Lincolnshire in 1950.

References

 
1872 births
1950 suicides
English cricketers
Sussex cricketers
North v South cricketers
Lincolnshire cricketers
People from Boston, Lincolnshire
Cricketers who have taken ten wickets in an innings
People educated at Boston Grammar School
Suicides by drowning in England